Karen MacNeill (born January 7, 1972 in Calgary, Alberta) is a former field hockey striker from Canada, who earned a total number of 105 international caps for the Canadian Women's National Team during her career. She won a bronze medal, at the 1999 Pan American Games.

She played club hockey on national level for Phoenix Calgary, and earned a Masters of arts degree in sport psychology at the University of Ottawa, and a Masters of science degree in counselling psychology from the University of Calgary.  MacNeill also played in the Dutch League, in the 1998-1999 season, for Amsterdam.  She is a Ph.D candidate at the University of British Columbia, and is working as a sport psychologist with Olympic and domestic level athletes.

International Senior Tournaments
 1995 – Pan American Games, Mar del Plata, Argentina (3rd)
 1995 – Olympic Qualifier, Cape Town, South Africa (7th)
 1997 – World Cup Qualifier, Harare, Zimbabwe (11th)
 1998 – Commonwealth Games, Kuala Lumpur, Malaysia (not ranked)
 1999 – Pan American Games, Winnipeg, Canada (3rd)
 2001 – Pan American Cup, Kingston, Jamaica (3rd)
 2001 – World Cup Qualifier, Amiens/Abbeville, France (10th)

References

External links
 Field Hockey Canada

1972 births
Canadian female field hockey players
Field hockey players at the 1998 Commonwealth Games
Living people
Sportspeople from Calgary
University of Ottawa alumni
Pan American Games medalists in field hockey
Pan American Games bronze medalists for Canada
Field hockey players at the 1995 Pan American Games
Medalists at the 1995 Pan American Games
Commonwealth Games competitors for Canada